is a general-interest weekly magazine published in Tokyo, Japan.

History and profile
Shūkan Gendai was started in 1959. The magazine has its headquarters in Tokyo. It is published by Kodansha, the largest publishing house in Japan, which covers entertainment news, as well as hard news such as interviews with the Prime Minister of Japan and other VIPs in the political and financial world.  It also contains essays and opinions by well-known authors in serial form. In its photo section, it runs news photos in both black and white and in color.

The magazine competes primarily with three other weekly magazines: Shūkan Bunshun, Shūkan Shincho and Shūkan Post.

Although the magazine is aimed primarily at businessmen in their 40s to 60s, recently the female readership has been increasing, with 30% of the readership now female as against 10% in the past.

Shūkan Gendai is well known for its anti-nuclear power stance including opposing the restarting nuclear power stations. In November 2012 the magazine was verbally warned by the Japanese authorities due to the obscene photos of female genitalia published.

In 2001 Shūkan Gendai had a circulation of 720,000 copies. It was 383,860 copies in 2010 and 407,949 copies in 2011.

List of manga
Onward Towards Our Noble Deaths, by Shigeru Mizuki
Path of the Assassin, by Kazuo Koike and Goseki Kojima
Samurai Executioner, by Kazuo Koike and Goseki Kojima
Tokumei Kakarichō Tadano Hitoshi, by Kimio Yanagisawa

References

External links
 Shukan Gendai Online
Sports Illustrated article about the Romanian gymnast controversy

1959 establishments in Japan
Kodansha magazines
Magazines established in 1959
Magazines published in Tokyo
Men's magazines published in Japan
Weekly magazines published in Japan